Fabio Digenti (born 6 March 1983) is a Swiss football coach and a former player. He is the manager of fourth-tier Swiss 1. Liga club FC Linth 04.

Club career
Digenti previously played in the Swiss Super League for Grasshoppers.

He also has Italian and English descent.

See also
Football in Switzerland
List of football clubs in Switzerland

References

1983 births
Footballers from Zürich
Swiss people of Italian descent
Living people
Swiss men's footballers
Association football midfielders
Grasshopper Club Zürich players
FC Schaffhausen players
FC Winterthur players
FC Wohlen players
FC Gossau players
FC Chiasso players
Swiss Super League players
Swiss Challenge League players
Swiss 1. Liga (football) players
Swiss football managers